Glastonbury Market Cross is a market cross in Glastonbury, Somerset, England. Erected in 1846, it was designed by the English architect Benjamin Ferrey and has been a Grade II listed structure since 1950.

History
Glastonbury's cross replaced an earlier structure of early 16th century origin, described as having been "of some antiquity", octagonal with clustered pillars, a central column and a roof. It fell into a state of disrepair and was demolished around 1806. Later in the 19th century, T. Porch, the proprietor of Glastonbury Abbey, proposed that a new market cross be erected on the same site. It was erected in 1846 under the supervision of Ferrey and has most recently undergone restoration in 2005.

Design
Glastonbury Cross is built of Bath stone in a Perpendicular Gothic style and has a height of 38 feet. It has an octagonal base supporting a spirelet, which is embellished with ornamental work and tracery.

Reporting on the cross in 1846, The Gentleman's Magazine described it as an "elegant structure" and a "great ornament to the town" with a "noble and imposing appearance". They added: "It is of a mixed style of architecture, conceived upon the outline of the famous conduit at Rouen, and from the elegant crosses of Geddington and Waltham".

References

Glastonbury
Grade II listed buildings in Mendip District
Market crosses in England